Finding You may refer to:

 "Finding You" (The Go-Betweens song), a single (2005)
 "Finding You", a single released by Australian singer Jack Vidgen (2012)
 Finding You (film), a 2021 American coming-of-age comedy-drama film